Christopher Brian Stringer  is a British physical anthropologist noted for his work on human evolution.

Biography

Growing up in a working-class family in the East End of London, Stringer first took an interest in anthropology during primary school, when he undertook a project on Neanderthals. Stringer studied anthropology at University College London, holds a PhD in Anatomical Science and a DSc in Anatomical Science (both from Bristol University).

Stringer joined the permanent staff of  the Natural History Museum in 1973. He is currently Research Leader in Human Origins.

Research

Stringer is one of the leading proponents of the recent African origin hypothesis or ″Out of Africa″ theory, which hypothesizes that modern humans originated in Africa over 100,000 years ago and replaced, in some way, the world's archaic humans, such as Homo floresiensis and Neanderthals, after migrating within and then out of Africa to the non-African world within the last 50,000 to 100,000 years. He always considered that some interbreeding between the different groups could have occurred, but thought this would have been trivial in the big picture. However, recent genetic data show that the replacement process did include some interbreeding. In the last decade he has proposed a more complex version of events within Africa, which he has termed ″multiregional African origin″.

He also directed the Ancient Human Occupation of Britain project which ran for about 10 years from 2001. This consortium reconstructed and studied the episodic pattern of human colonisation of Britain during the Pleistocene. He is co-director of the follow-up project "Pathways to Ancient Britain".

Honours
He is a Fellow of the Royal Society and Honorary Fellow of the Society of Antiquaries. He won the 2008 Frink Medal of the Zoological Society of London and the Rivers Memorial Medal from the Royal Anthropological Institute in 2004

He was elected a Member of the American Philosophical Society in 2019.

Stringer was appointed Commander of the Order of the British Empire (CBE) in the 2023 New Year Honours for services to the understanding of human evolution.

Publications

Papers

Books
 
 
 
 
 
 
 
 "Introduction to the fiftieth anniversary edition of The Piltdown Forgery" (pp. vii–x | and "Afterword: Piltdown 2003" (pp. 188–201). In The Piltdown Forgery By J. S. Weiner (2003) Oxford: Oxford University Press. 
 . 
 
 , published in the United States in 2012 retitled as

See also
 Happisburgh footprints

References

External links 
 Prof Chris Stringer's Home Page at Natural History Museum
 Natural History Museum Homo britannicus news (11 October 2006)
 AHOB Home Page
 World Land Trust Supporter news (Wednesday, 25 June 2008)
 Homo britannicus Archaeology award (13 November 2008)
 RESET Project
 Human Evolution book news (19 May 2005)

British anthropologists
British paleoanthropologists
Human evolution theorists
1947 births
Living people
Alumni of University College London
Alumni of the University of Bristol
Recent African origin of modern humans
Fellows of the Royal Society
Employees of the Natural History Museum, London
Members of the American Philosophical Society